Jolly Widows is a South Korean romance musical drama starring Shim Hye-jin, Lee Jong-soo, Park Hae-mi, Lee Chung-ah, Park Han-byul and Jo An. It aired on KBS1 from June 29, 2009 to January 29, 2010 on Mondays to Fridays at 20:25 for 155 episodes.

Plot
Two women became widows on the same day, same hour.

Ha Yoon-jung becomes the matriarch of her husband's family, supporting them because she feels guilty about her husband's disappearance. Oh Dong-ja, Yoon-jung's sister-in-law, has been living with Yoon-jung's help as well. After the terrifying day when they lost their husbands, the two women have been living as each other's friend and companion.

However, they become implacable enemies because of their children, since their daughters are rivals in love. And then Yoon-jung's husband, whom everyone assumed was dead, suddenly appears before them as the future father-in-law of Dong-ja's son.

Cast
The Widows' family
Shim Hye-jin as Ha Yoon-jung (Soo-hyun's mother)
Park Hae-mi as Oh Dong-ja (Jin-woo & Jin-kyung's mother)
Kim Young-ok as Park Jung-nyeo (mother-in-law/grandmother)
Lee Chung-ah as Han Soo-hyun
Kim Ji-won as young Soo-hyun
Oh Man-seok as Han Jin-woo
Park Han-byul as Han Jin-kyung

Lee family
Lee Jong-soo as Lee Chul
Lee Joong-moon as Lee Han (older brother)
Choi Joo-bong as Lee Jang (father)
Kim Bo-mi as Lee Jung-sook (aunt, Lee Jang's sister)

Kang family
Jo An as Kang Na-yoon
Lee Eung-kyung as Na Eun-hye (mother)
Hong Yo-seob as Kang Shin-wook (stepfather, Eun-hye's husband)
Seo Ji-hee as Kang Na-jung (Eun-hye & Shin-ok's daughter)

Extended cast
Lee Jong-won as Lee Joon-woo
Kim Seok-ok as Joon-woo's mother
Kim Byung-man as Moon Goon (Yoon-jung's auto mechanic)
Han Seol-ah as Mi-kyung (Han Jin-kyung's friend)
Jung Sung-woon as Min Kyung-hyun (animation producer)
Lee Da-in as Cha Seung-min
Kim Do-yeon

Awards and nominations

References

External links
 
 

Korean Broadcasting System television dramas
2009 South Korean television series debuts
2010 South Korean television series endings
Korean-language television shows
South Korean romance television series